Dirk De Bock (born 9 October 1944) is a sailor from Belgium. He was born in Wilrijk. De Bock represented his country at the 1972 Summer Olympics in Kiel. De Bock took 18th place in the Soling with Charles de Bondsridder and Walter Haverhals as fellow crew members.

References

1944 births
Living people
People from Wilrijk
Belgian male sailors (sport)
Sailors at the 1972 Summer Olympics – Soling
Olympic sailors of Belgium
Sportspeople from Antwerp
Snipe class sailors